Jay Michael Gruden (born March 4, 1967) is an American football coach and former quarterback. He previously served as the head coach of the Washington Redskins from 2014 to 2019 and as offensive coordinator for the Cincinnati Bengals and Jacksonville Jaguars. During his time in the Arena Football League (AFL), he won four ArenaBowls as a player and two more as a head coach. Gruden is the younger brother of former NFL head coach Jon Gruden and was an assistant coach of the 2002 Buccaneers team that won Super Bowl XXXVII.

Early years
Of Slovene descent, Gruden was born in Tiffin, Ohio, and was raised a Roman Catholic. He attended George D. Chamberlain High School in Tampa, Florida, where he played quarterback for the Chamberlain Chiefs high school football team under head coach Billy Turner.

College career
Gruden attended the University of Louisville, where he was a four-year letterman at Louisville Cardinals football team (1985–1988). He finished his collegiate career with 7,024 passing yards (as of 2013, fourth all-time for the school), completing 572 of 1049 passes for 44 touchdowns. All four stats still rank in the top five in Cardinals history. He also ranks in Louisville's top 10 for yards per completion, passing attempts in a season, and completions in a season. He ranks eighth in career completion percentage, seventh in career passing efficiency, and ninth in average yards per game for the Cardinals. Gruden threw for over 300 yards in a game six times at Louisville. Gruden led the team to an 8–3 record as a senior, their first winning season in 10 years.

Professional career

Europe
Gruden played two seasons in the World League of American Football in Spain (with Barcelona in 1991 and 
with the Scottish Claymores in Scotland in 1995).

NFL
He also spent 3 seasons of time in the NFL (Phoenix) and CFL (Sacramento) on practice squads.

Arena
Gruden won four ArenaBowl titles as the starting quarterback of the Tampa Bay Storm in the Arena Football League. He was named the league's MVP in 1992. After stepping off the field to coach, Gruden returned to the field in 2002 as a member of the Orlando Predators.

Honors and awards
1992: League MVP & First Team All-Arena
1993: ArenaBowl VII MVP
1993: All-Star Game MVP
1995: First Team All-Arena
1996: AFL's 10th Anniversary Team
1999: AFL Hall of Fame & All-ArenaBowl Team
2001: Second Team 15th Team Anniversary
2006: Ranked fourth on the AFL's list of greatest players

Coaching career

Arena Football League
Gruden began his coaching career as the offensive coordinator for the AFL's Nashville Kats in 1997. In 1998, he became head coach of the Orlando Predators, the main rival of the Storm. With Orlando, he won ArenaBowl titles in 1998 and 2000. He came out of retirement and resumed playing in 2002, this time for the Predators, but retired again and returned to head coaching when his replacement, Fran Papasedero, died after the 2003 season. Gruden has an overall AFL head coaching record of 93–61, including a mark of 11–7 in the playoffs.

Tampa Bay Buccaneers
From 2002 to 2008, he served as an offensive assistant for the Tampa Bay Buccaneers in the National Football League under his brother, head coach Jon Gruden, earning a Super Bowl ring for the Bucs' win in Super Bowl XXXVII. He left the team after his brother was fired following the 2008 season.

Florida Tuskers
In 2009, while the Predators were on hiatus during the bankruptcy reorganization of the AFL, he was selected to be head coach Jim Haslett's offensive coordinator for the Florida Tuskers of the United Football League. As part of his contract, he was not permitted to remain head coach of the Predators. Instead, former Orlando quarterback Pat O'Hara, who led the team to its two ArenaBowl titles when Gruden was head coach, was hired in his place.

On February 20, 2010, Gruden was named head coach of the Tuskers following Haslett's departure to join Mike Shanahan's staff with the NFL's Washington Redskins.

Cincinnati Bengals
On February 3, 2011, Gruden was hired as the offensive coordinator for the Cincinnati Bengals. On January 13, 2012, Gruden signed a three-year extension with the Bengals at the position, even after being asked to interview for at least three NFL head coaching jobs (with the Jacksonville Jaguars, St. Louis Rams, and later turning down the Indianapolis Colts).

In January 2013, Gruden was interviewed by the NFL's Arizona Cardinals, Philadelphia Eagles, and San Diego Chargers for their vacant head coaching positions.

Gruden's offense helped lead the Bengals to three straight Wild Card playoff appearances, including the AFC North title in 2013.

Washington Redskins
On January 9, 2014, Gruden was hired as the new head coach of the Washington Redskins, succeeding Mike Shanahan. Since Gruden was a highly sought after coach, Redskins owner Dan Snyder gave him a fully guaranteed, 5-year contract worth $20 million.

In the 2015 season, Gruden led the Redskins to their first playoff appearance since 2012. The Redskins would go on a 4-game winning streak to finish the season, and win the NFC East with a 9–7 record. However, the Redskins lost to the Green Bay Packers in the Wild Card round 35–18, ending their season. In 2016, the Redskins finished 8–7–1, but missed the playoffs. This marked the first time the Redskins posted back-to-back winning seasons since the 1996 and 1997 seasons.

On March 4, 2017, Jay Gruden signed a two-year contract extension with the team. On October 7, 2019, Gruden was fired after starting the season 0–5, finishing his overall tenure as head coach at 35–49–1.

Jacksonville Jaguars
On January 22, 2020, Gruden was hired by the Jacksonville Jaguars as their offensive coordinator under head coach Doug Marrone. Alongside Doug Marrone and the rest of the team's coaches, he was let go following the season after the team finished with a franchise-worst 1–15 record.

Los Angeles Rams
Gruden was hired as an offensive consultant for the Los Angeles Rams in 2022.

Head coaching record

AFL

UFL

NFL

Personal life
Gruden's father, Jim, a long-time college and NFL assistant coach, was a former regional scout for the San Francisco 49ers. His brother Jon was the head coach of the Las Vegas Raiders and the Tampa Bay Buccaneers, winning a Super Bowl in 2002. His other brother, James, is a radiologist at the University of North Carolina School of Medicine.

References

External links

 AFL player bio
 AFL coach bio

1967 births
Living people
People from Tiffin, Ohio
American Roman Catholics
Players of American football from Tampa, Florida
American football quarterbacks
George D. Chamberlain High School alumni
Louisville Cardinals football players
Barcelona Dragons players
Tampa Bay Storm players
Orlando Predators players
Coaches of American football from Florida
Nashville Kats coaches
Orlando Predators coaches
Tampa Bay Buccaneers coaches
Florida Tuskers coaches
United Football League (2009–2012) head coaches
Cincinnati Bengals coaches
National Football League offensive coordinators
Washington Redskins head coaches
Jacksonville Jaguars coaches
American expatriate players of American football